The 9th Moscow International Film Festival was held from 10 to 23 July 1975. The Golden Prizes were awarded to the Polish film The Promised Land directed by Andrzej Wajda, the Soviet-Japanese film Dersu Uzala directed by Akira Kurosawa and the Italian film We All Loved Each Other So Much directed by Ettore Scola.

Jury
 Stanislav Rostotsky (USSR - President of the Jury)
 Sergio Amidei (Italy)
 Hortensia Bussi (Chile)
 Antonin Brousil (Czechoslovakia)
 Ravjagiin Dorjpalam (Mongolia)
 Jerzy Kawalerowicz (Poland)
 Ramu Kariat (India)
 Nevena Kokanova (Bulgaria)
 Komaki Kurihara (Japan)
 Ababakar Samb (Senegal)
 Jean-Daniel Simon (France)
 Iosif Kheifits (USSR)
 Sofiko Chiaureli (USSR)
 Monsef Charfeddin (Tunisia)
 Bert Schneider (USA)

Films in competition
The following films were selected for the main competition:

Awards
 Golden Prize:
 The Promised Land by Andrzej Wajda
 Dersu Uzala by Akira Kurosawa
 We All Loved Each Other So Much by Ettore Scola
 Silver Prizes:
 Chorus by Mrinal Sen
 My Brother Has a Cute Brother by Stanislav Strnad
 Allpakallpa by Bernardo Arias
 Special Prizes:
 Director: Zoltán Fábri for 141 Minutes from the Unfinished Sentence
 The Year of the Solar Eclipse by Dshamjangijn Buntar
 Prizes:
 Best Actor Miguel Benavides for The Other Francisco
 Best Actor Georgi Georgiev-Getz for A Peasant on a Bicycle
 Best Actress Harriet Andersson for The White Wall
 Best Actress Fatima Bouamari for The Legacy
 Diploma:
 Kafr kasem by Borhane Alaouié
 The Republic of Užice by Žika Mitrović
 Girl from Hanoi by Hai Ninh
 Castle of Sand by Yoshitarō Nomura
 The Other Francisco by Sergio Giral
 Actress: Malini Fonseka for How to Be an Adult
 Prix FIPRESCI: Dersu Uzala by Akira Kurosawa

References

External links
Moscow International Film Festival: 1975 at Internet Movie Database

1975
1975 film festivals
1975 in the Soviet Union
1975 in Moscow